The 1911 Chicago Maroons football team was an American football team that represented the University of Chicago during the 1911 college football season.  In their 20th season under head coach Amos Alonzo Stagg, the Maroons compiled a 6–1 record, finished in second place in the Western Conference with a 5–1 record against conference opponents, and outscored all opponents by a combined total of 78 to 42.

The team included the future University of Chicago head basketball coach Nelson Norgren as well as Clark G. Sauer and Horace Frank Scruby, consensus all-conference players.

Schedule

Roster

Head coach: Amos Alonzo Stagg (20th year at Chicago)

References

Chicago
Chicago Maroons football seasons
Chicago Maroons football